The 1998 World Snooker Championship (also referred to as the 1998 Embassy World Snooker Championship for the purposes of sponsorship) was a professional ranking snooker tournament that took place between 18 April and 4 May 1998 at the Crucible Theatre in Sheffield, England.

John Higgins won his first World title by defeating defending champion Ken Doherty 18–12 in the final. Doherty became another World Champion who fell to the Crucible curse and could not defend his first World title. However, Doherty has come closer than any other first-time champion bar Joe Johnson to retaining his championship.  The tournament was sponsored by cigarette manufacturer Embassy.

Tournament summary
 Stephen Hendry lost in the first round 4–10 to Jimmy White. It was the first time since his debut in 1986 that he lost in the last 32 and it was also the first quarter-final stage not to feature Hendry since 1988.
 Simon Bedford, David Gray, Quinten Hann, Matthew Stevens, Terry Murphy, Alfie Burden, Peter Lines and Jason Prince made their Crucible debuts this year. Only Stevens could advance to the second round by defeating Alain Robidoux 10–8.
 Stephen Hendry's eight-year run as the world number one ended and he was replaced by John Higgins.

Prize fund
The breakdown of prize money for this year is shown below:
Winner: £220,000
Runner-up: £132,000
Semi-final: £66,000
Quarter-final: £33,000
Last 16: £17,750
Last 32: £12,000
Highest break £19,000
Maximum break £147,000
Total £1,323,000

Main draw 
Shown below are the results for each round. The numbers in parentheses beside some of the players are their seeding ranks (each championship has 16 seeds and 16 qualifiers).

Century breaks
There were 59 century breaks in the championship, a new record which would last until 2002. John Higgins' 14 centuries in the tournament was a new record, beating the 12 made by Stephen Hendry in 1995.

 143, 139, 131, 130, 130, 128, 119, 118, 114, 111, 109, 104, 103, 102  John Higgins
 143, 138, 118, 106  Jimmy White
 141, 134, 118, 104, 100  Ronnie O'Sullivan
 141  Peter Lines
 140, 107  David Gray
 137, 134, 131, 112  Ken Doherty
 137  Dave Harold
 137  James Wattana
 133, 109  Stephen Lee
 127, 100  Matthew Stevens

 124, 117, 109, 108, 108, 104  Peter Ebdon
 120, 108, 104, 102  John Parrott
 115, 108, 102, 100  Anthony Hamilton
 115, 105  Alfie Burden
 112  Darren Morgan
 111  Alan McManus
 105, 100  Fergal O'Brien
 103, 100  Mark King
 102  Mark Williams

Qualifying 

The qualifying matches were held between 2 January and March 1998 at the Newport Centre in Newport, Wales.

Round 1–2

Round 2–3

Round 1

Round 2–3

References

World Snooker Championships
World Championship
World Snooker Championship
Sports competitions in Sheffield
World Snooker Championship
World Snooker Championship